Sideridis uscripta is a species of cutworm or dart moth in the family Noctuidae. It is found in North America.

The MONA or Hodges number for Sideridis uscripta is 10261.

References

Further reading

 
 
 

Hadenini
Articles created by Qbugbot
Moths described in 1891